{{Infobox animanga/Other
| title           = Related
| content         = 
Blood: The Last Vampire (2000 anime film)Blood: The Last Vampire (2009 live-action film)Blood-C (2011 anime series)
}}Blood+ (stylized as BLOOD+; pronounced "Blood Plus") is a Japanese anime television series produced by Production I.G and Aniplex and directed and written by Junichi Fujisaku. The series was broadcast on MBS and TBS from October 2005 to September 2006.  Blood+ is licensed for international distribution in several regions through Sony Pictures' international arm, Sony Pictures Television International (SPTI).Blood+ was inspired by the 2000 anime film Blood: The Last Vampire; however, there are only a few allusions and basic elements from the film. Fujisaku has been involved with both works, including acting as the director and writer for Blood+ and writing the novelization of Blood: The Last Vampire.

Plot

The series is initially set in September 2005 in Okinawa City (Koza) on Okinawa Island near the US Kadena Air Base. Under the care of her adoptive family, the protagonist Saya Otonashi had been living the life of an anemic amnesiac, but otherwise ordinary schoolgirl. However, her happy life is shattered when she is attacked by a Chiropteran, a hematophagous bat-like creature that lives by feeding on human blood. Saya learns that she is the only one who can defeat them, as her blood causes their bodies to crystallize and shatter. Armed with her special katana, Saya embarks on a journey with her family, friends, allies, and her chevalier Haji, to rid the world of the Chiropteran threat and recover her identity. The course of the journey reveals the background history of the Chiropterans and Saya's mysterious past, which extends into the mid-19th century. Over the course of the series, Saya travels across the world from Japan to Vietnam, Russia, France, the United Kingdom, and finally the United States.

Production
Produced by Production I.G and Aniplex and directed and written by Junichi Fujisaku, Blood+ was inspired by the 2000 anime film Blood: The Last Vampire; however, there are only a few allusions and basic elements from the film. Fujisaku has been involved with both works, including acting as the director for Blood+ and writing the novelization of Blood: The Last Vampire.

Media
Anime

The Blood+ anime series premiered in Japan on October 8, 2005, on MBS/TBS, replacing Mobile Suit Gundam SEED Destiny, with a new episode airing weekly until the final episode aired September 23, 2006, totaling 50 episodes. The series is directed by Junichi Fujisaku and features original character designs by Chizu Hashii. Each season has separate opening and ending themes from a variety of artists, with the final episode using the season one ending theme. The series simultaneously aired on Animax, Sony's Japanese anime satellite channel, with its networks in Southeast Asia and South Asia also later airing the series.

Through Sony's international division, Blood+ was licensed for distribution in multiple regions. The English dub of the series, aired in the United States on Cartoon Network's Adult Swim programming block, premiering March 11, 2007, and running till March 23, 2008. The English dub also aired in Australia on the Sci Fi Channel and in the Philippines on Studio 23.

The first Region 1 DVDs were released in North America on March 4, 2008, with a simultaneous release of a single five-episode volume and a twenty-five episode box set, Blood+ Part One. Sony continued released individual volumes on a regular basis. Despite that Sony Pictures Television International since 2014 has not completed releasing Volume 5 of the first half of the series. Leaving the first half separate releases incomplete. The second half was released in a second box set, Blood+ Part Two, on October 20, 2009. In June 2020 the entire series was added for free streaming in the US on Tubi TV.

Soundtracks
Except for the opening and ending themes, the entire musical score for Blood+ was the work of noted film score producer Hans Zimmer and noted composer Mark Mancina. Blood+ was the first anime project Mancina worked on, and afterward he stated that working on the project turned him into an anime fan. All of the opening and ending themes were created at Sony Music for the project, after the production team, headed by Yutaka Omatsu, presenting the project concept and Blood+ worldview. The opening and ending themes are performed by a variety of artists, including Hitomi Takahashi, Chitose Hajime, Hyde, Mika Nakashima, Angela Aki, Uverworld, Jinn, and K. In an interview with Production I.G staff, Omatsu noted that he felt Sony did an excellent job of providing music fitting for each season, as did the team of Zimmer and Mancina.

Four CD soundtracks, all produced by Hans Zimmer, have been released in Japan by Sony Music Japan through their Aniplex label.  was released on February 2, 2006. The soundtrack included a DVD with a special episode telling some of Hagi's backstory and a music video with Furukawa playing the first track, .

The first full soundtrack, Blood+ Original Soundtrack 1, was released on April 26, 2006. It contains fourteen instrumental tracks of background music used during the series and one vocal song "Diva", sung by Elin Carlson, which is the song the character Diva sang in several episodes of the series. On September 27, 2006, Blood+ Original Soundtrack 2 was released with an additional eighteen tracks of instrumental themes from the series. Blood+ Complete Best, released October 25, 2006, is a limited edition compilation set containing a CD, a DVD, and an eighty-page booklet that includes a full episode guide and some final notes from the series production staff.  The CD includes the full versions of all eight series' opening and ending theme songs, as well as last two instrumental tracks from the first soundtrack.  The DVD contains music videos for each of the theme songs from the CD.

Manga

To lead up to the Blood+ anime series, three Blood+ manga series were released and published in three different manga magazines. The tankōbon volumes of all three series were published by Kadokawa Shoten. Blood+, by Asuka Katsura, is a five-volume series that first premiered in Monthly Shōnen Ace in July 2005. It covers the same story events as the anime series. Blood+: Adagio was written by Kumiko Suekane. It is a two-volume series that premiered in the September 2005 issue of Beans Ace Magazine and follows Saya and Hagi's experiences during the Russian Revolution. It premiered in the September issue of Asuka Ciel. Set in Shanghai, it follows Hagi as he searches for Saya and the complications he must deal with. Unlike the other Blood+ manga adaptations, which are both shōnen works, Blood+: Kowloon Nights is a shōjo manga, particularly of the shōnen-ai (or Boy's Love) genre. All three manga adaptations have been licensed for release in English in North America by Dark Horse Comics.

Novels

There are two Japanese light novel adaptations of the Blood+ series. Blood+, written by Ryō Ikehata with illustrations by Chizu Hashii, is the four volume official novel adaptation of the anime series, expanding upon the events of the fifty-episode anime series and giving greater background on the battle against chiropterans. The first volume was released in Japan on May 1, 2006, by Kadokawa Shoten under their male oriented Kadokawa Sneaker Bunko label.  The remaining volumes released every four months until the final volume was released on May 1, 2007.

The second adaptation titled , is a two-volume series written by Karino Minazuki and illustrated by Ryō Takagi. It was released at the same time as Blood+, with the first volume was released on May 1, 2006, and the second on September 1, 2006. The series, published under Kadokawa's female oriented label Beans Bunko, details Saya and Hagi's lives at the start of the 20th century and the Russian Revolution.

Both novel series have been licensed for release in English in North America by Dark Horse Comics. Dark Horse released the first translated Blood+ novel on March 19, 2008.

In 2017, Fujisaku wrote a third novelization of Blood+, titled Blood#, which takes place after the series finale, focusing on Diva's grown children, Hibiki and Kanade.

Video games
Two Sony PlayStation 2 video games have been created that are based on the Blood+ series. Both games are currently only available in Japan and have not been licensed for release in any other countries.Blood+: One Night Kiss, from Namco Bandai Games and Grasshopper Manufacture, is an action-adventure game that was originally released on August 30, 2006. Set in the fictional town of Shikishi, players spend most of the game playing as Saya, occasionally switching to Aoyama, an original character created for the game. Goichi Suda was the game's director and writer in consultation with Fujisaka, while Masafumi Takada was composer. Production was completed on a tight five month schedule so it would release within the anime's broadcast. The cel-shaded graphics based on those of Suda's earlier title Killer7 using a custom-built engine for the PlayStation 2, while the purely urban setting was settled on by Suda as a return to the setting of his earlier game Moonlight Syndrome. Suda and the studio were asked to hold back on their established tone, with Suda's initial plan for the game's Saya to be a Chiroptera clone killed at the game's end being vetoed.

, from Sony Entertainment, is an adventure game released on July 27, 2006. Set during the year between episodes 32 and 33, after Riku's death, the game alternates between an "Active Demo" section where the player can make decisions that change the story line, and full action sequences where the player, as Saya, fights with her sword to collect chiropteran crystals.

In addition to the two PS2 games, Sony Entertainment released the PSP game  on September 7, 2006.  It is an adventure role-playing video game that uses animated sequences from the series as well as new footage created specifically for the game. The game is set during the first season of the series, and features an original story in which Saya, joined by three friends from school, investigates the mystery of her father's disappearance.

A Java game, covering most of the anime's plot is also available.

Fan book
In September 2006, Newtype released BLOOD + Encyclopedia, a special issue fan book that includes interviews with the staff and cast, an episode guide, and information on the related media – the manga, novels and video games.

Reception
When Blood+ first aired in Japan, it was shown in TBS/MBS's 6 pm. Sunday timeslot, which has mostly been used to air anime since 1993.  After Blood+ began airing, the ratings for that time slot began dropping.  The drop in viewership became more pronounced after NHK's baseball anime Major premiered on a competing channel in the time slot.

Carl Kimlinger of Anime News Network gave the series an overall score of B stating, "The plot is propulsive, never lingering for long in one place, yet never rushing to leave. Slickly executed, compulsively watchable and highly entertaining". In December 2005, Blood+'' was one of several anime series selected as being a "recommended as an excellent work" at the 9th annual Japanese Media Arts Festival. The series was ranked number 41 on TV Asahi's list of top 100 favorite anime series for 2006.

See also
Vampire film
List of vampire television series

References

External links

 Official Blood+ website 
 Official MBS Blood+ website 
 Official Production I.G Blood+ website
 

2005 anime television series debuts
2005 manga
2006 Japanese novels
2006 Japanese television series endings
2006 manga
2006 video games
Action anime and manga
Animax original programming
Aniplex
Blood: The Last Vampire
Dark fantasy anime and manga
Dark Horse Comics titles
Fiction about amnesia
Fiction set in the 2000s
Films scored by Mark Mancina
Hack and slash games
Japan-exclusive video games
Kadokawa Beans Bunko
Kadokawa Shoten manga
Kadokawa Sneaker Bunko
Light novels
Mainichi Broadcasting System original programming
Military anime and manga
Okinawa Prefecture in fiction
PlayStation 2 games
Production I.G
Seinen manga
Shōjo manga
Shōnen manga
Suspense anime and manga
Television series by Sony Pictures Television
TBS Television (Japan) original programming
Video games about vampires
Vampires in animated television
Vampires in anime and manga
Video games based on anime and manga
Video games developed in Japan
Video games featuring female protagonists
Video games with cel-shaded animation
Vietnam War fiction
Yakuza in anime and manga